Araleri  is a gram panchayat village in Karnataka, India. Araleri is located in  Malur Taluk of Kolar district which is also one of the constituency of Kolar Jilla Panchayat and Malur Taluk Panchayat,  at a distance of 6 km from the town of Malur and 32 km from Kolar.

Villages in Araleri Gram Panchayat

References

External links
 http://Kolar.nic.in/

Villages in Kolar district